The African trident bat (Triaenops afer) is a species of bat found in Africa.

Taxonomy and etymology
It was described as a new species in 1877 by German zoologist Wilhelm Peters.
It was considered a subspecies of the rufous trident bat from approximately 1963–2009, when  morphological and genetic analyses showed that it was a distinct species.
Its species name "afer" is Latin for "African."

Biology and ecology
It is nocturnal, roosting in sheltered places during the day such as caves or abandoned mines.
Roosts can consist of up to half a million individuals, as this is a colonial species.

Range and habitat
Triaenops afer has been documented in Eritrea, Mozambique, southwest Congo, and northwest Angola. Previously believed to be the only member of its genus found in continental Africa, recent research incorporating morphological data and echolocation calls has shown that only the populations in coastal regions along the Indian Ocean and in the highlands of central Kenya and Ethiopia are T. afer, with the populations in the Rift Valley of Kenya actually being Triaenops persicus.

References

Bats of Africa
Triaenops
Mammals described in 1877
Taxa named by Wilhelm Peters